In poetry, a trimeter (Greek for "three measure") is a metre of three metrical feet per line. Examples:

 When here // the spring // we see,
 Fresh green // upon // the tree.

See also
 Anapaest
 Dactyl
 Tristich
 Triadic-line poetry

References

 

Types of verses